Éric Occansey (born 17 August 1954 in Jœuf, France) is a French basketball player who played 44 times for the men's French national basketball team between 1986 and 1989.

References

French men's basketball players
1964 births
Living people
Sportspeople from Meurthe-et-Moselle
20th-century French people